Ilia Vekua (23 April 1907 in the village of Shesheleti, Kutais Governorate, Russian Empire (modern day Gali District, Abkhazia, Republic of Georgia – 2 December 1977 in Tbilisi, USSR) was a distinguished Georgian mathematician and engineer, specializing in partial differential equations, singular integral equations, generalized analytic functions and the mathematical theory of elastic shells.

Ilia Vekua was born in 1907 in the Georgian village Sheshelety. After finishing school in Zugdidi, he entered Physics and Mathematics Department at Tbilisi State University. Vekua graduated in 1930 and was made a professor there in 1940. He was also deputy-director of the Steklov Institute of Mathematics (1954–1959), the first rector of Novosibirsk State University (1959–1964), and vice-president (1964–1965) and president (1972–1977) of the Georgian Academy of Sciences. In 1969 he became the Hero of Socialist Labour. Vekua was awarded the Stalin Prize (1950), Lenin Prize (1963), USSR State Prize (1984), three Orders of Lenin and the Order of the Badge of Honor. The Sukhumi Institute of Physics and Technology, formerly near Sukhumi (Abkhazia), now in Tbilisi/Georgia, which was involved in the nuclear weapons program of the Soviet Union, is also named after him.

See also
Complex analysis
Solomon Mikhlin
Linear elasticity

Notes

References
.

 

1907 births
1977 deaths
People from Ochamchira District
People from Sukhum Okrug
Mingrelians
Communist Party of the Soviet Union members
20th-century mathematicians from Georgia (country)
Soviet mathematicians
Academic staff of the Moscow Institute of Physics and Technology
Full Members of the USSR Academy of Sciences
Academic staff of Novosibirsk State University
Rectors of Tbilisi State University
Members of the Georgian National Academy of Sciences
Members of the German Academy of Sciences at Berlin
Heroes of Socialist Labour
Lenin Prize winners
Stalin Prize winners
Recipients of the USSR State Prize
Recipients of the Order of Lenin
Burials at Mtatsminda Pantheon